Michael Leahy (1 March 1895 – 13 April 1950) was an Irish hurler who played as a left corner-forward for the Tipperary and Cork senior teams from 1916 until 1931. 

Leahy joined the Tipperary team as a substitute during the 1916 championship and lined out at irregular intervals over the course of the following decade. In 1927 Leahy joined the Cork senior hurling team, remaining with 'the Rebels' until 1931. Throughout his long career he won one All-Ireland winner's medal and two Munster winner's medals.

At club level Hassett played with the Boherlahan–Dualla and Thurles Sarsfields in Tipperary and with Blackrock in Cork, winning numerous county club championship winners' medals.

References

1895 births
1950 deaths
Boherlahan-Dualla hurlers
Thurles Sarsfields hurlers
Blackrock National Hurling Club hurlers
Tipperary inter-county hurlers
Cork inter-county hurlers
All-Ireland Senior Hurling Championship winners